The 1994 Central Michigan Chippewas football team represented Central Michigan University in the Mid-American Conference (MAC) during the 1994 NCAA Division I-A football season.  In their first season under head coach Dick Flynn, the Chippewas compiled a 9–3 record (8–1 against MAC opponents), won the MAC championship, lost to UNLV in the Las Vegas Bowl, and outscored their opponents, 400 to 315.  The team played its home games in Kelly/Shorts Stadium in Mount Pleasant, Michigan, with attendance of 104,144 in five home games.

The team's statistical leaders included quarterback Erik Timpf with 1,315 passing yards, tailback Brian Pruitt with 1,890 rushing yards, and flanker Terrance McMillan with 398 receiving yards. Pruitt's 1,890 rushing yards remains a Central Michigan record, as do his 1994 totals of 132 points scored, 20 rushing touchdowns, and 22 total touchdowns in a season.  His tally of 435 yards of total offense against Toledo on November 5, 1994, remains a school record, and his total of 356 rushing yards in the same game was a school record until Robbie Mixon rushed for 377 yards in a game in 2002. Pruitt was selected by the Associated Press as a first-team all-purpose player on the 1994 College Football All-America Team. He was also named the MAC Player of the Year and Central Michigan's most valuable player. Pruitt, tight end Jerremy Dunlap, offensive guard Matt Nastally, and safety Quincy Wright were selected as first-team All-MAC player.

Dick Flynn was named MAC Coach of the Year in his first year as head coach. Flynn took over as Central Michigan's head football coach in March 1994, after Herb Deromedi became the school's athletic director.

Schedule

References

Central Michigan
Central Michigan Chippewas football seasons
Mid-American Conference football champion seasons
Central Michigan Chippewas football